The Gildersleeve Prize is an annual award of $1,000 to the author of "the best article of the year" published in the American Journal of Philology. It is awarded by The Johns Hopkins University Press and is named after the classical scholar Basil Lanneau Gildersleeve who founded the journal. As of 2019, the prize is named the "AJP Best Article Prize."

Previous winners are:

References

Awards for scholarly publications
Classics journals